Duangsavath Souphanouvong is a Laotian politician. He is a member of the Lao People's Revolutionary Party. He is a representative of the National Assembly of Laos for Sainyabuli Province (Constituency 7).
In 2007, he is Government Apparatus Minister, Adviser to the LPDR Prime Minister (Minister of the Prime Minister's Palace).

References

Members of the National Assembly of Laos
Lao People's Revolutionary Party politicians
Year of birth missing (living people)
Living people
Government ministers of Laos
People from Sainyabuli province